Pennsylvania Route 86 (abbreviated PA 86, officially SR 886) is a  state highway in Crawford County, Pennsylvania, United States. The northern terminus of the route is at U.S. Route 6, U.S. Route 19, and Pennsylvania Route 408 in Cambridge Springs. The southern terminus is at Pennsylvania Route 27 in Meadville.

Due to the presence of Interstate 86 (State Route 86) in Erie County, PA 86 is officially State Route 886.

Nearby attractions include Allegheny College and Woodcock Lake.

From 1936 to 1983, PA 86 extended from US 19 north of Waterford to PA 27 in Meadville. In 1983, the northern terminus was moved to its present location at US 6 and US 19 in Cambridge Springs.

Route description

PA 86 begins at an intersection with PA 27 in the city of Meadville, heading north on two-lane undivided North Main Street. The road passes a mix of homes and businesses, heading into more residential areas and passing to the east of Allegheny College. The route runs near more homes before briefly heading into West Mead Township, where it is known as North Main Street Extension. PA  86 crosses into Woodcock Township and becomes an unnamed road, passing through a mix of farms and woods with some homes. The route continues northeast and forms a short concurrency with PA 198. The road passes through the residential community of Grange Hall before continuing through more agricultural areas with occasional homes. PA 86 becomes Center Street before entering Woodcock, where the road passes a few residences on Main Street. The route crosses into Cambridge Township and becomes an unnamed road again, continuing through farmland and woodland with some homes. The road curves to the north and enters the borough of Cambridge Springs, where it becomes South Main Street. Here, the route passes homes, turning northeast and heading into the commercial downtown. PA 86 crosses a Western New York and Pennsylvania Railroad line and immediately ends at an intersection with US 6/US 19 and PA 408.

Major intersections

PA 86 Alternate Truck

Pennsylvania Route 86 Alternate Truck was a truck route around a weight-restricted bridge over the Gravel Run, on which trucks over 32 tons and combination loads over 40 tons were prohibited.  The route followed PA 198, PA 77, and PA 408. The route was signed in 2013. The bridge was completely reconstructed in 2017, and all signage was removed, effectively deleting the route.

See also

 List of state highways in Pennsylvania
 List of highways numbered 86

References

External links

Pennsylvania Highways: PA 86

086
Transportation in Crawford County, Pennsylvania